Trilogy: The Weeping Meadow (Greek: Τριλογία: Το λιβάδι που δακρύζει) is a 2004 Greek historical drama film written and directed by Theo Angelopoulos. It stars Alexandra Aidini, Thalia Argyriou, Giorgos Armenis, Vasilis Kolovos and Nikos Poursanidis, and was released during the 2004 Berlin International Film Festival on 11 February 2004.

It is the first film of a projected trilogy about recent events in Greek history. Followed in 2008 with The Dust of Time, the trilogy was ultimately left incomplete after Angelopoulos' unexpected death in January 2012.

Plot
The film revives themes of Angelopoulos' 1975 film The Travelling Players, and its events span from 1919 to the aftermath of World War II. It tells the story of Greek history through the sufferings of one family. A band of refugees that returns to Greece after the Russian Revolution adopts an orphaned girl, Eleni (Alexandra Aidini). Eleni becomes the focus of the story. The film follows her through adolescence and the marriage to her musician adopted-brother Alexis (Nikos Poursanidis). Eleni becomes pregnant by Alexis, and bears twin boys, who are sent away at birth. Many years later she is forced to marry her widowed adopted father. On her wedding day, Eleni escapes with Alexis to Thessaloniki, where they reunite with their sons. Their lives are then ripped apart by World War II and the ensuing Greek Civil War.

Cast
 Alexandra Aidini as Eleni
 Thalia Argyriou as Danae
 Giorgos Armenis as Nikos the Fiddler
 Vasilis Kolovos as Spyros
 Nikos Poursanidis as Alexis

 Eva Kotamanidou as Cassandra
 Toula Stathopoulou as Woman in Coffee House

Reception

Critical reception
Trilogy: The Weeping Meadow received generally favorable reviews from critics. At Metacritic it holds a 73/100 score based on 12 reviews. At Rotten Tomatoes it has a 67% score based on 27 reviews, with an average rating of 6.3/10. Peter Bradshaw of The Guardian gave the film two out of five stars, and commented: "The movie is fiercely austere; no human emotion leaks out and the characters are as blank as chess-pieces." Dana Stevens of The New York Times: "The Weeping Meadow is a beautiful and devastating meditation on war, history and loss." Derek Elley of Variety: "The movie plays like a career summation in which the 68-year-old writer-director has simply run out new ideas."

Awards and nominations
Awards
 FIPRESCI Award at the European Film Awards 2004
 "Spiritual Competition" Jury Award at the Fajr International Film Festival 2005
Nominations
 Golden Bear at the Berlin International Film Festival 2004
 European Film Awards 2004
 "People's Choice Award"
 "Best Director" (Theodoros Angelopoulos)
 "Best Cinematographer" (Andreas Sinanos)
 "Best Composer" (Eleni Karaindrou)

References

External links
 
 
 
 
 

2004 films
2004 drama films
Greek drama films
2000s Greek-language films
Films set in the 1920s
Films directed by Theodoros Angelopoulos
Films scored by Eleni Karaindrou
Films set in Thessaloniki
Hellenistic Greece